Daniel Carlsson (born 29 June 1976) is a rally car driver from Sweden.

Biography
Carlsson came in 2nd at the Swedish Junior Rally Championship in 1998 when he was only 22. He went on to compete in the Swedish Rally Championship in 1999, finishing 1st in Group H. In 1999 he finished 2nd again in the Swedish Juniors.

By 2000 he graduated to the WRC and finished 22nd at his home rally of Sweden driving a Toyota. The following year in the same event he finished 7th.

At his first Monte Carlo rally in 2002 he promptly came in 4th just off the podium driving a Ford Puma S1600. At his home rally of Sweden, driving a Mitsubishi in the group N class, he finished 1st.

In the 2005 WRC season Carlsson was asked to stand in for Markko Märtin after the Wales Rally GB, in which Märtin's co-driver was killed. Martin decided to quit for the rest of the season, therefore prompting Peugeot Sport team to hire Carlsson for the remainder of the season.

At the start of the 2006 season, Carlsson posted his best home result with a 3rd in the Swedish WRC Rally. For the 2006 season Carlsson drove a Mitsubishi Lancer Evolution with co-driver Bo Holmstrand.

In 2007, Carlsson was caught for drunk driving, had his driving license revoked, and decided to quit his rally career.

WRC results

JWRC results

References

External links
 Official site
 Profile of the driver from Ewrc-results.com

1976 births
Living people
Swedish rally drivers
World Rally Championship drivers
Peugeot Sport drivers